The Playoff MVP award for the World Hockey Association was handed out annually from 1975 to 1979 to the most valuable player of the playoffs.

Winners
1975 – Ron Grahame, Houston Aeros
1976 – Ulf Nilsson, Winnipeg Jets
1977 – Serge Bernier, Quebec Nordiques
1978 – Robert Guindon, Winnipeg Jets
1979 – Rich Preston, Winnipeg Jets

See also
Conn Smythe Trophy

References

World Hockey Association trophies and awards